The California state elections, 2006 took place on November 7, 2006. Necessary primary elections were held on June 6. Among the elections that took place were all the seats of the California's State Assembly, 20 seats of the State Senate, seven constitutional officers, and all the seats of the Board of Equalization. Votes on retention of two Supreme Court justices and various Courts of Appeal judges were also held. Five propositions were also up for approval.

United States Senate

United States House of Representatives

Constitutional officers

Governor

Lieutenant Governor

Secretary of State

State Controller

State Treasurer

Attorney General

Insurance Commissioner

Board of Equalization

Overview

District 1

District 2

District 3

District 4

Judicial system
Voters are asked to vote on the retention of judicial seats within the Supreme Court of California and the California Courts of Appeal. Both of the two associate justices of the Supreme Court and all 55 judges of the Courts of Appeal retained their seats.

Supreme Court

California Courts of Appeal
See California Courts of Appeal elections, 2006.

State Senate

There are 40 seats in the State Senate, the upper house of California's bicameral State Legislature. For this election, candidates running for even-numbered districts ran for four-year terms. The California Democratic Party maintained its majority control.

State Assembly

All 80 biennially-elected seats of the State Assembly, the lower house of California's bicameral State Legislature, were up for election this year. The California Democratic Party retained control of the State Assembly.

The 67th State Assembly district was left vacant after Republican Tom Harman won a special election to fill the 35th State Senate district on June 12, 2006. There was not enough time to schedule a special election for the Assembly seat, but Republican Jim Silva succeeded him after winning this election.

Statewide ballot propositions

Thirteen propositions, including five bond measures, qualified to be listed on the general election ballot in California. All five bond measures passed, but only two non-bonds, 83 and the bond-like 84, won approval.

Proposition 1A
1A would amend the California constitution to limit the conditions under which the transfer of gasoline sales tax revenues from transportation costs to other uses may be allowed.  Suspensions would be treated as loans to the General Fund which must be repaid in full, including interest, and suspensions would not be allowed more than twice every ten years. Additionally, all prior suspensions would need to be paid off before another suspension could be put into effect. Proposition 1A passed with 76.6% approval.

Proposition 1B
1B authorizes the state to sell $20 billion in bonds to fund transportation projects related to congestion, the movement of goods, air quality and transportation security. Proposition 1B passed with 61.3% approval.

Proposition 1C
1C authorizes the state to sell $2.85 billion in bonds to fund new and existing housing and development programs. Proposition 1C passed with 57.5% approval.

Proposition 1D
1D allows the state to sell $10.4 billion in bonds to fund construction and building modernization for K-12 schools and institutions of higher education. Proposition 1D passed with 56.6% approval.

Proposition 1E
1E authorizes the state to sell $4.1 billion in bonds for flood management programs. Proposition 1E passed with 64.0% approval.

Proposition 83

Increases the severity of punishments for sex crimes in several ways.  It broadens the definition of certain sex offenses, lengthens penalties, prohibits probation for some crimes, eliminates early release credits for some offenses, extends parole for some specific sex offenses, and increases court-imposed fees on sex offenders.  83 is a lengthy and complex proposition, a complete summary of which can be found here.  Proposition 83 passed with 70.5% approval.

It effectively blocks offenders from living in the vast majority of the areas of large California cities.

Within 24 hours of its passage, its enforcement was blocked by U.S. District Judge Susan Illston, who ruled in a lawsuit filed by an existing offender based on its retroactive nature.

Proposition 84
Allows the state to sell $5.4 billion in bonds to fund programs for safe water supply and quality, flood control, park improvements and natural resource protection. Proposition 84 passed with 53.8% approval.

Proposition 85

Amends the state constitution to require, except in certain circumstances, doctors to inform the parent or legal guardians of an unemancipated minor at least 48 hours before an abortion is performed on that minor; a process by which the minor can obtain a legal waiver of the notification requirement is also included in the text. Proposition 85 failed to pass with 45.9% approval.

Proposition 86

Amends the state constitution to increase the excise tax on tobacco cigarettes by $2.60 per pack, in order to fund healthcare expansion. Proposition 86 failed to pass, with 48.0% approval.

Proposition 87

Imposes a tax of 1.5% to 6% on oil extracted from California (excluding offshore drilling on federally managed land) with the goal of decreasing petroleum consumption in California by 25%. The $4 billion raised by this tax would go towards research into alternative energy sources, as well as incentives for businesses and vehicle owners utilizing alternative energy and energy efficient technology. Proposition 87 failed to pass with 45.3% approval.

Proposition 88
Amends the state constitution to allow for a $50 "parcel tax" on the ownership of plots of land (with exclusions for certain elderly or disabled landowners) to provide additional public school funding. Proposition 88 failed to pass with 23.1% approval.

Proposition 89

Raises income tax on corporations and financial institutions by .2% in order to fund expanded public campaign funding for eligible state office candidates, and imposes new limits on contributions to campaigns. Proposition 89 failed to pass with 25.5% approval.

Proposition 90

Limits the ability of state or local governments to seize private land for public use, and significantly increases the compensation the government must provide to landowners if new laws result in a change in value to their property. This proposition is part of a national response to the Supreme Court case Kelo v. City of New London, in which the Court asserted the right of governments to seize land for private development if it benefits the public at large. Proposition 90 failed to pass with 47.5% approval.

See also
California State Legislature
California State Assembly
California State Assembly elections, 2006
California State Senate
California State Senate elections, 2006
Political party strength in U.S. states
Political party strength in California
Elections in California
Districts in California

External links
"A directory of California state propositions"
Official election results form the California Secretary of State
California Legislative District Maps (1911-Present)
RAND California Election Returns: District Definitions

References
 Poll results October 2006

 
California